"Around and Around" is a 1958 rock song written and first recorded by Chuck Berry. It originally appeared under the name "Around & Around" as the B-side to the single "Johnny B. Goode".

Cover versions

The Rolling Stones 
The Rolling Stones covered the song on their EP, Five by Five and second U.S. album 12 X 5 in 1964. Besides the band members it featured Ian Stewart on piano. In October 1964, they performed the song as part of their first appearance on The Ed Sullivan Show. They played it on a regular basis on their tours in 1964 and 1965. In 1964 the Stones opened their famed TAMI Show with the song. After more than a decade they performed the song again at the Knebworth Fair on August 21, 1976. It was also included on the 1977 live album Love You Live, from the El Mocambo club gig in Toronto. After that, it has only been performed occasionally, most recently during the band's 2012 U.S. tour at Prudential Center in Newark, New Jersey on December 15.

In Sweden, the song was considered as the lead track from the Five by Five EP and as such reached the charts, peaking at number three on Tio i Topp and number five on Kvällstoppen.

David Bowie 
English musician David Bowie recorded the song in 1971, produced by Ken Scott, under the title "Round and Round". Originally slated for inclusion on his 1972 album The Rise and Fall of Ziggy Stardust and the Spiders from Mars, it was ousted by "Starman" at the last minute. Regarding the song, Bowie stated in 1972: "It would have been the kind of number that Ziggy would have done onstage...He jammed it for old times' sake in the studio, and our enthusiasm for it probably waned after we heard it a few times. We replaced it with a thing called 'Starman'. I don't think it's any great loss, really." "Round and Round" was eventually released as the B-side of the single "Drive-In Saturday" in April 1973. The original single mix was included on the compilations Rare (1982) and Re:Call 1, part of the Five Years (1969–1973) compilation (2015).  Alternate mixes were included on Bowie's Sound + Vision box sets (1989, 2003) and on the bonus disc of the Ziggy Stardust - 30th Anniversary Reissue (2002). Bowie also performed it live on 3 July 1973 at the final concert of the Ziggy Stardust Tour, featuring Jeff Beck on guitar. The song was not included in the D. A. Pennebaker-directed film of the concert or the accompanying soundtrack album.

Other artists 
The Swinging Blue Jeans included a version on their 1964 album Blue Jeans a'Swinging, on their label His Master's Voice HMV 1802.

The Animals covered it on both their US debut album The Animals, MGM Records – SE 4264, and their UK debut album also called The Animals, Columbia (EMI) 33SX 1669, in 1964. Eric Burdon had it also included on some of his live sets. The Animals performed the song in the MGM film Get Yourself a College Girl (1964).

U.S. rock band Pearl Jam released an in-studio version as the b-side of its 2016 Christmas single.

The song was a staple of the Grateful Dead, who played it in concert over 400 times between 1970 and 1995. It appears on 19 Grateful Dead albums, and nine more by related acts from the Grateful Dead family.

Meat Loaf placed the song in his "Rock 'n Roll Medley" during his 1989 tour for a short time.

38 Special covered the song on their 1977 self titled debut album.

Maureen Tucker of The Velvet Underground also recorded the song for her 1981 debut solo album Playin' Possum. It was released as a single as a double a-side with "Will You Love Me Tomorrow?".

American punk rock band Germs released their version of the song which is included on the posthumous What We Do Is Secret EP released in 1981, as well as (MIA): The Complete Anthology released in 1993. Although originally a Chuck Berry song, their version is much closer to Bowie's version. Lead singer, Darby Crash was heavily influenced by Bowie, as well as other members of the band.

Dayton, Ohio based indie rock band Guided By Voices has regularly included the song in their live sets since their 1996 Mag Earwig tour.

It was also covered by Waysted in their 1985 album The Good The Bad and The Waysted. The song is a staple of their live set since.

Japanese band The Joint, recorded a version with changed lyrics (mostly in Japanese about being constantly drunk) on their CD Hoochie Coochie Men.

The song was also a staple at Argentine band Los Piojos's live shows, and a medley featuring "Around & Around" and "Blue Suede Shoes" (renamed in Spanish as Zapatos de Gamuza Azul) was released on their 1999 live album Ritual.

See also
Round and Round (disambiguation)

References

External links
 Video of the Rolling Stones performance, 1964

1958 songs
1958 singles
Chuck Berry songs
The Rolling Stones songs
The Animals songs
David Bowie songs
Grateful Dead songs
Songs written by Chuck Berry